Empress Deng may refer to:

Empress Deng Sui (鄧綏) (81–121), Chinese empress of the Han Dynasty, married to Emperor He
Empress Deng Mengnü (鄧猛女) (died 165), Chinese empress of the Han Dynasty, married to Emperor Huan

Deng